Mecidiye (in older publications also spelled as Medjidiye, or Médjidié) was a protected cruiser of the Ottoman Empire that saw action during the Balkan Wars and World War I. It was ordered by the Ottoman Navy in 1900 to the United States shipbuilding company William Cramp & Sons. It was laid down in Philadelphia on 7 November 1901; launched on 25 July 1903; its sea trials began in October 1903; and it was commissioned on 19 December 1903.

It had two 152mm L/45 quick firing guns, eight 120mm L/45 quick firing guns, six 47mm quick firing guns, six 37mm quick firing guns, and two 457mm torpedo tubes.

History
Mecidiye, named after Sultan Abdülmecid I, was launched on 25 July 1903 and commissioned on 19 December 1903.

Balkan Wars

In October 1912, Mecidiye shelled Bulgarian forts near Varna and other military targets. On 9 December, she was attacked by the Greek submarine  at 800 meters, but the torpedo missed. Mecidiye also participated in the two major naval battles of the war, against the Greek Navy, at Elli (16 December 1912) and Lemnos (18 January 1913), suffering slight damage in the first. On 18 February 1913, Mecidiye was part of the covering naval force for the Ottoman shore landing at Şarköy.

World War I

During the First World War, Mecidiye operated in the Black Sea.

In December 1914, the ship transported Hafiz Hakki Bey to Trebizond to deliver messages to the 3rd Army's Chief of Staff.

The ship was raised by the Russians on 31 May 1915, and salvaged on 8 June 1915. It was refitted at the Ropit Yard in Odessa before being commissioned by the Russian Navy with the name Prut (Pruth) on 29 October 1915.

On 1 May 1918 it was captured by the German forces at Sevastopol and was returned to the Ottoman Navy on 13 May 1918, which re-commissioned the ship as Mecidiye.

Turkish Navy service, 1927–1947

Under the terms of the Treaty of Sèvres in 1920, Ottoman warships were to be handed over to the Allies, in particular the United Kingdom, as war compensation. However, the ensuing Turkish War of Independence culminated in the abrogation of the Treaty of Sèvres; it was replaced by the Treaty of Lausanne in 1923, which permitted the new Turkish Republic to retain the former Ottoman fleet, including Mecidiye. All warships of the former Ottoman Navy which survived World War I (they were interned at the Golden Horn and the Sea of Marmara under Allied control) were transferred to the Turkish Navy in 1925.

After reparation works at the Gölcük Naval Shipyard between 1925 and 1927, Mecidiye was commissioned by the Turkish Navy in June 1927. It was among the large surface combatants of the Turkish Navy between 1927 and 1940, when it became a cadet training ship, being used for this purpose until being decommissioned on 1 March 1947. The ship was sold for scrap in 1952, and broken up between 1952 and 1956.

Notes

Bibliography
 Erickson, Edward J., Defeat in detail: the Ottoman Army in the Balkans, 1912–1913, Greenwood Publishing, 2003.
 Erickson, Edward J., Ordered to die: a history of the Ottoman army in the First World War, Greenwood Press, 2001.
 Gardiner, Robert, Randal Gray and Przemyslaw Budzbon, Conway's All the World's Fighting Ships 1906–1921, Naval Institute Press, 1985.
 Sondhaus, Lawrence, Naval warfare, 1815–1914, Routledge, 2001.

External links
 Article on the Mecidiye at the Turkey in the First World War website 

1903 ships
Ships built by William Cramp & Sons
Cruisers of the Ottoman Navy
Naval ships of the Ottoman Empire in the Balkan Wars
World War I cruisers of the Ottoman Empire
Maritime incidents in 1915
World War I shipwrecks in the Black Sea
Ships sunk by mines
Captured ships
Ships of the Imperial Russian Navy
Ships of the Turkish Navy